Walter Ochong'a Mong'are Snr. (born March 26, 1975) is the Kenyan former Director in youth programs (liaison) presidency and cabinet affairs office in the government of Kenya. He also served as director of communications at Nairobi City County after leaving Kenya Broadcasting Corporation as Group Head of Radio. Walter Mong'are is a music lover and has released a few singles in his own name. He is a husband and father.

Politics
In 2022, he availed himself as a Presidential candidate in the Kenyan elections under the Umoja Summit Party. His candidature was initially approved by the Independent Electoral and Boundaries Commission but revoked days later after discrepancies emerged over his academic qualifications.

Education
He attended Lenana School (1991 - 1994). He is a Daystar University Bachelor of Education graduate. Formerly attended Kenyatta University where he started entertainment career.

Singles
 "Sweet Banana" featuring Talia
 "Must be Nyambane" featuring Natasha Gatabaki
 "Slowly my Dear" featuring Sanaipei Tande/Megcy
 "Dereva Wawili" featuring Prince Adio

References

External links

1975 births
Living people
Kenyan male television actors
21st-century Kenyan male singers
Kenyatta University alumni
Alumni of Lenana School